Nishada benjaminea is a moth of the family Erebidae. It was described by Walter Karl Johann Roepke in 1946. It is found on Sulawesi.

References

Lithosiina
Moths described in 1946